Reese Brantmeier (born October 5, 2004) is an American tennis player. She has played in the US Open Doubles tournament.

Tennis career
Brantmeier won the 2019 United States 16s national title. She finished second at the 2021 United States 18s national title, losing to Ashlyn Krueger.

Brantmeier has a career high WTA singles ranking of 420 achieved on May 16, 2022. She also has a career high WTA doubles ranking of 1144 achieved on October 18, 2021.

At the 2022 US Open, she and Clervie Ngounoue received a wildcard to the Women's doubles tournament.

Background
Brantmeier is the daughter of Scott and Becky Brantmeier. She was raised near Whitewater, Wisconsin. Her father is a doctor and she has two brothers. She began online schooling and living out of a hotel room with her mother while training at the United States Tennis Association's National Campus in Orlando, Florida.

ITF Circuit finals

Singles: 2 (2 runner-ups)

Doubles: 3 (1 title, 2 runner–up)

Junior Grand Slam finals

Doubles: 1 (1 runner-up)

References

External links

2004 births
Living people
American female tennis players
21st-century American women
Tennis people from Wisconsin